Fendley Glacier is a glacier,  long, flowing northeast from the Admiralty Mountains to enter the sea between Mount Cherry-Garrard and the Atkinson Cliffs, on the north coast of Victoria Land, Antarctica. This geographical feature was first mapped by the United States Geological Survey from surveys and U.S. Navy air photos, 1960–63, and was named by the Advisory Committee on Antarctic Names for Tech. Sergeant  Iman A. Fendley, United States Air Force, who perished in the crash of a C-124 Globemaster aircraft in this vicinity in 1958. The glacier lies situated on the Pennell Coast, a portion of Antarctica lying between Cape Williams and Cape Adare.

References 

Glaciers of Pennell Coast